Naval Weapons Station may stand for:

 Naval Weapons Station Charleston, South Carolina
 Naval Weapons Station Earle, New Jersey
 Naval Weapons Station Seal Beach, California
 Naval Weapons Station Yorktown, Virginia
 Naval Air Weapons Station China Lake, California
 former Concord Naval Weapons Station, California